Forest County is a county in the U.S. state of Wisconsin. As of the 2020 census, the population was 9,179. Its county seat is Crandon. The Forest County Potawatomi Community and the Sokaogon Chippewa Community have reservations in Forest County.

History
Forest County was created by the Wisconsin State Legislature in 1885 from portions of neighboring Langlade and Oconto counties. The county was named for the forests contained within its limits.

Geography

Adjacent counties
 Florence County - northeast
 Marinette County - east
 Oconto County - southeast
 Langlade County - southwest
 Oneida County - west
 Vilas County - northwest
 Iron County, Michigan - north

Major highways

Railroads
Watco

Buses
List of intercity bus stops in Wisconsin

Airport
 Y55 - Crandon Municipal Airport

National protected area
 Nicolet National Forest (part)

Demographics

2020 census
As of the census of 2020, the population was 9,179. The racial makeup of the county was 80.7% White, 13.4% Native American, 0.3% Black or African American, 0.2% Asian, 0.1% Pacific Islander, 0.2% from other races, and 5.1% from two or more races. Ethnically, the population was 1.7% Hispanic or Latino of any race.

2000 census

As of the census of 2000, there were 10,024 people, 4,043 households, and 2,769 families residing in the county. The population density was 10 people per square mile (4/km2). There were 8,322 housing units at an average density of 8 per square mile (3/km2). The racial makeup of the county was 85.86% White, 11.30% Native American, 1.18% Black or African American, 0.17% Asian, 0.04% Pacific Islander, 0.23% from other races, and 1.22% from two or more races. 1.08% of the population were Hispanic or Latino of any race. 34.3% were of German, 11.4% Polish, 7.4% Irish and 5.4% American ancestry. 95.5% spoke English, 1.4% Spanish and 1.0% Potawatomi as their first language.

Out of the 4,043 households, 29.20% had children under the age of 18, 54.00% had a married couple living together, 9.80% had a female householder with no husband present, and 31.50% were non-families. 28.20% of all households were made up of individuals living alone, and 13.20%, of individuals of 65 years of age or older living alone. The average household size was 2.39 and the average family size was 2.89.

The age distribution in the county's population was as follows: 25.30% under the age of 18, 7.80% from 18 to 24, 23.90% from 25 to 44, 23.80% from 45 to 64, and 19.30% 65 years of age or older.  The median age was 40 years. For every 100 females there were 100.20 males. For every 100 females age 18 and over, there were 99.00 males.

In 2017, there were 102 births, giving a general fertility rate of 71.1 births per 1000 women aged 15–44, the 14th highest rate out of all 72 Wisconsin counties. There were fewer than five reported induced abortions performed on women of Forest County residence in 2017.

Communities

City
 Crandon (county seat)

Towns

 Alvin
 Argonne
 Armstrong Creek
 Blackwell
 Caswell
 Crandon
 Freedom
 Hiles
 Laona
 Lincoln
 Nashville
 Popple River
 Ross
 Wabeno

Census-designated places
 Argonne
 Laona
 Mole Lake
 Newald
 Wabeno

Unincorporated communities

 Alvin
 Armstrong Creek
 Atkins
 Blackwell
 Blackwell Junction
 Bonneval
 Carter
 Cavour
 Hiles
 Laona Junction
 Nashville
 Nelma
 Padus
 Popple River
 Soperton
 Wisconsin Junction
 Woodlawn

Ghost towns/neighborhoods
 Bagdad
 Keith

Images

Politics

See also
 National Register of Historic Places listings in Forest County, Wisconsin

References

Further reading
 Youth Community Conservation Improvement Program. Memories of Forest County: A Historical Research Project. n.p., n.p., 1980.

External links
 Forest County
 Forest County map from the Wisconsin Department of Transportation
 Forest County tourism
 Forest County Potawatomi
 City of Crandon

 
1885 establishments in Wisconsin
Populated places established in 1885